The Foundling Hospital was a hospital for abandoned children in Dublin, Ireland which was established as part of the South Dublin Union.

History
The Foundling hospital of Dublin was opened in 1704.
Firmly established by mid-18th century, the Foundling Hospital had steadily become a large "baby farming" institution. Two primary objectives of the hospital were to avoid deaths and murders of illegitimate children and to teach the Protestant faith to these children.

No inquiry was made about the parents, and no money received. A cradle was installed by 1730. Between 1,500 and 2,000 children were received annually. A large income was derived from a duty on coal. In 1822 an admission fee of £5 was charged on the parish from which the child came. This reduced the annual arrivals to about 500.

Child deaths during transport to the hospital or whilst staying in the hospital were not infrequent and would often become the subject of an inquiry. The number of Protestant nurses was usually inadequate with the resulting use of Roman Catholic nurses and occasional consequence of "religious error".

Between 1790 and 1796 some 5,216 infants were sent there, of whom 5,215 died. Between 1796 and 1826 51,150 infants were admitted to the hospital, of whom  41,524 died. In 1829 the select committee on the Irish miscellaneous estimates recommended that no further assistance should be given. Only during the tenure of Lady Arabella Denny and later the other “Ladies Governesses” did the death rate and horrific conditions of the foundling hospital improve. However during its existence the hospital had not preserved life or educated the foundlings. The mortality was nearly 4 in 5, and the total cost climbing to almost £40,000 a year. Accordingly, in 1835 Lord Glenelg (then Irish Secretary) closed the institution.

New National Children's Hospital
A new children's hospital has been proposed to move the National Children's Hospital from Tallaght University Hospital on to the campus of St. James's Hospital.

Former senator,  John Gilroy, said that given the presence of the foundling hospital on the site and the very high death rate, there was a possibility that children might have been buried there. However extensive investigation including the environmental impact study and the site excavation works found no evidence of any graves on the site.

See also
 Foundling hospital
 House of Industry (Dublin)

References 

1704 establishments in Ireland
Hospitals established in 1704
Hospitals in Dublin (city)
Foundling Hospital
Defunct hospitals in the Republic of Ireland
Demolished buildings and structures in Dublin